Victoria Cruz is an American LGBT rights activist and retired domestic violence counselor. A contemporary of activists Marsha P. Johnson and Sylvia Rivera, she is featured in the 2017 documentary The Death and Life of Marsha P. Johnson.

Early life and education
Cruz was born in Guánica, Puerto Rico. At the age of four, she moved with her family, which grew to 11 children, to Red Hook, Brooklyn. Cruz came out as transgender at a young age, later stating "I was born different and I always acted as a female." Her family was supportive of her.

Cruz graduated from high school with a cosmetology license, and later majored in theater at Brooklyn College. After finding a doctor to assist in her gender transition, Cruz performed as a stripper and dancer at clubs in the West Village. She spent time at the Stonewall Inn during the era of the Stonewall riots, as she was dating one of the club's doormen. In 1970, one year after the Stonewall uprising, Cruz took part in the first Gay Pride march, then called the Christopher Street Liberation Day.

Career and activism
Unable to find work in theater after graduating from Brooklyn College, Cruz worked as a hairdresser. She struggled financially, and became addicted to crack cocaine.

Cruz then began working at the Cobble Hill Nursing Home in Brooklyn. In 1996, four female co-workers groped and sexually harassed her. With the help of the Anti-Violence Project, she reported the assault. Two of the four women were found guilty of harassment; the others were acquitted.

Cruz then began working with the Anti-Violence Project in 1997. She dedicated her life to helping victims of anti-LGBT violence and rape.

In 2017, Cruz was featured in the David France documentary The Death and Life of Marsha P. Johnson. In the film, Cruz conducts an investigation into how Johnson, whose 1992 death was initially ruled a suicide, really died. Cruz has referred to Johnson as the "Rosa Parks of our community." The documentary premiered at the 2017 Tribeca Film Festival, and was subsequently acquired by Netflix for worldwide distribution, with a release date of October 6.

Honors and recognition
 2012 – National Crime Victim Service Award (awarded by Attorney General Eric Holder)

References

External links
 

1940s births
Activists from New York City
Puerto Rican transgender people
American LGBT rights activists
Living people
Transgender women
Transgender rights activists
LGBT people from New York (state)
People from Guánica, Puerto Rico
People from Red Hook, Brooklyn
Brooklyn College alumni